The following is a list of Malayalam films released in the year 1972.

Dubbed Films

References

 1972
1972
Malayalam